The 2011–12 Milwaukee Bucks season was the 44th season of the franchise in the National Basketball Association (NBA). For the first time since 1999-2000 season, Michael Redd was not on the opening day roster. The Bucks finished the season with a 31–35 record and in 9th place in the Eastern Conference, four games behind the Philadelphia 76ers, who claimed the last berth for the 2012 NBA Playoffs. The regular season was reduced from its usual 82 games to 66 due to the lockout.

Key dates
 June 23: The 2011 NBA draft took place at Prudential Center in Newark, New Jersey.
 December 26: Milwaukee started the regular season with a loss against the Charlotte Bobcats.

Roster

Pre-season
Due to the 2011 NBA lockout negotiations, the programmed pre-season schedule, along with the first two weeks of the regular season were scrapped, and a two-game pre-season was set for each team once the lockout concluded.

|- bgcolor="#ffcccc"
| 1
| December 17
| @ Minnesota
| 
| Jon Leuer (18)
| Andrew Bogut (6)
| Mike Dunleavy, Jr. (5)
| Target Center15,013
| 0–1
|- bgcolor="#ffcccc"
| 2
| December 21
| Minnesota
| 
| Drew Gooden (15)
| Ersan İlyasova (6)
| Brandon Jennings (9)
| Bradley Center
| 0-2

Regular season

Standings

Record vs. opponents

Game log

|- bgcolor=#ffcccc
| 1
| December 26
| @ Charlotte
| 
| Brandon Jennings (22)
| Andrew BogutErsan İlyasova (9)
| Shaun Livingston (6)
| Time Warner Cable Arena17,173
| 0–1
|- bgcolor=#ccffcc
| 2
| December 27
| Minnesota
| 
| Brandon Jennings (24)
| Andrew Bogut (9)
| Mike Dunleavy (8)
| Bradley Center17,352
| 1–1
|- bgcolor=#ccffcc
| 3
| December 30
| Washington
| 
| Brandon Jennings (22)
| Andrew Bogut (15)
| Brandon Jennings (5)
| Bradley Center17,065
| 2–1

|- bgcolor=#ffcccc
| 4
| January 2
| @ Denver
| 
| Stephen Jackson (17)
| Carlos Delfino (9)
| Three players (4)
| Pepsi Center14,142
| 2–2
|- bgcolor=#ffcccc
| 5
| January 3
| @ Utah
| 
| Drew Gooden (24)
| Drew Gooden (12)
| Brandon Jennings (9)
| EnergySolutions Arena17,756
| 2–3
|- bgcolor=#ffcccc
| 6
| January 5
| @ Sacramento
| 
| Brandon Jennings (31)
| Drew Gooden (9)
| Brandon Jennings (7)
| Power Balance Pavilion11,813
| 2–4
|- bgcolor=#ffcccc
| 7
| January 7
| @ L. A. Clippers
| 
| Brandon Jennings (21)
| Drew Gooden (13)
| Brandon Jennings (7)
| Staples Center19,229
| 2–5
|- bgcolor=#ffcccc
| 8
| January 8
| @ Phoenix
| 
| Tobias Harris (15)
| Ersan İlyasova (8)
| Brandon JenningsShaun Livingston (4)
| US Airways Center13,420
| 2–6
|- bgcolor=#ccffcc
| 9
| January 10
| San Antonio
| 
| Stephen Jackson (34)
| Andrew Bogut (11)
| Brandon Jennings (11)
| Bradley Center11,585
| 3–6
|- bgcolor=#ccffcc
| 10
| January 12
| Detroit
| 
| Brandon Jennings (27)
| Four players (6)
| Stephen Jackson (6)
| Bradley Center11,465
| 4–6
|- bgcolor=#ffcccc
| 11
| January 13
| @ Dallas
| 
| Brandon Jennings (19)
| Jon Brockman (9)
| Delonte West (4)
| American Airlines Center20,112
| 4–7
|- bgcolor=ffcccc
| 12
| January 16
| @ Philadelphia
| 
| Jrue Holiday (24)
| Andrew Bogut (11)
| Louis Williams (6)
| Wells Fargo Center17,281
| 4–8
|- bgcolor=ffcccc
| 13
| January 17
| Denver
| 
| Brandon Jennings (30)
| Ersan İlyasova (11)
| Andre Miller (11)
| Bradley Center11,322
| 4–9
|- bgcolor=#ccffcc
| 14
| January 20
| @ New York
| 
| Brandon Jennings (36)
| Tyson Chandler (12)
| Brandon Jennings (5)
| Madison Square Garden19,763
| 5–9
|- bgcolor=#ccffcc
| 15
| January 22
| @ Miami
| 
| LeBron James (28)
| LeBron James (13)
| Brandon Jennings (6)
| American Airlines Arena19,600
| 6–9
|- bgcolor=ffcccc
| 16
| January 23
| Atlanta
| 
| Joe Johnson (26)
| Zaza Pachulia (14)
| Brandon Jennings (12)
| Bradley Center13,048
| 6–10
|- bgcolor=#ccffcc
| 17
| January 25
| @ Houston
| 
| Kevin Martin (29)
| Ersan İlyasova (19)
| Kyle Lowry (10)
| Toyota Center10,573
| 7–10
|- bgcolor=ffcccc
| 18
| January 27
| @ Chicago
| 
| Derrick Rose (34)
| Joakim Noah (16)
| Drew Gooden (6)
| United Center22,368
| 7–11
|- bgcolor=#ccffcc
| 19
| January 28
| L. A. Lakers
| 
| Kobe Bryant (27)
| Pau Gasol (15)
| Kobe Bryant (9)
| Bradley Center18,027
| 8–11
|- bgcolor=#ccffcc
| 20
| January 30
| Detroit
| 
| Brandon Jennings (21)
| Greg Monroe (10)
| Beno Udrih (6)
| Bradley Center13,103
| 9–11

|- bgcolor=#ccffcc
| 21
| February 1
| Miami
| 
| LeBron James (40)
| Ersan İlyasova (14)
| Brandon Jennings (8)
| Bradley Center16,116
| 10–11
|- bgcolor=ffcccc
| 22
| February 3
| @ Detroit
| 
| Brandon Knight (26)
| Ersan İlyasova (12)
| Brandon Knight (7)
| The Palace of Auburn Hills13,181
| 10–12
|- bgcolor=ffcccc
| 23
| February 4
| Chicago
| 
| Derrick Rose (26)
| Luol Deng (9)
| Derrick Rose (13)
| Bradley Center18,717
| 10–13
|- bgcolor=ffcccc
| 24
| February 7
| Phoenix
| 
| Drew Gooden (25)
| Josh Childress (12)
| Steve Nash (11)
| Bradley Center13,203
| 10–14
|- bgcolor=#ccffcc
| 25
| February 8
| @ Toronto
| 
| Carlos Delfino (25)
| Drew Gooden (14)
| José Calderón (15)
| Air Canada Centre15,291
| 11–14
|- bgcolor=#ccffcc
| 26
| February 10
| @ Cleveland
| 
| Antawn Jamison (34)
| Tristan Thompson (13)
| Ramon Sessions (16)
| Quicken Loans Arena15,195
| 12–14
|- bgcolor=ffcccc
| 27
| February 11
| Orlando
| 
| Jason Richardson (31)
| Ersan İlyasova (16)
| Hedo Türkoğlu (6)
| Bradley Center17,723
| 12–15
|- bgcolor=ffcccc
| 28
| February 13
| Miami
| 
| LeBron James (35)
| Mike Miller (8)
| Chris Bosh (4)
| Bradley Center16,749
| 12–16
|- bgcolor=ffcccc
| 29
| February 15
| New Orleans
| 
| Ersan İlyasova (23)
| Gustavo Ayon (12)
| Greivis Vásquez (7)
| Bradley Center12,829
| 12–17
|- bgcolor=ffcccc
| 30
| February 17
| @ Orlando
| 
| Dwight Howard (26)
| Dwight Howard (20
| Hedo Türkoğlu (7)
| Amway Arena18,846
| 12–18
|- bgcolor=#ccffcc
| 31
| February 19
| @ New Jersey
| 
| Ersan İlyasova (29)
| Ersan İlyasova (25)
| Shaun Livingston (6)
| Prudential Center15,262
| 13–18
|- bgcolor=ffcccc
| 32
| February 20
| Orlando
| 
| Dwight Howard (28)
| Dwight Howard (16)
| Carlos Delfino (8)
| Bradley Center13,143
| 13–19
|- bgcolor=ffcccc
| 33
| February 22
| @ Chicago
| 
| Carlos Boozer (20)
| Joakim Noah (13)
| Joakim Noah (10)
| United Center21,507
| 13–20
|- bgcolor=#ccffcc
| 34
| February 28
| Washington
| 
| Mike Dunleavy (28)
| Ersan İlyasova (11)
| John Wall (15)
| Bradley Center13,548
| 14–20
|- bgcolor=ffcccc
| 35
| February 29
| @ Boston
| 
| Kevin Garnett (25)
| Chris Wilcox (13)
| Rajon Rondo (10)
| TD Garden18,624
| 14–21

|- bgcolor=ffcccc
| 36
| March 2
| @ Atlanta
| 
| Brandon Jennings (34)
| Josh Smith (19)
| Brandon Jennings (9)
| Philips Arena13,311
| 14–22
|- bgcolor=ffcccc
| 37
| March 3
| @ Orlando
| 
| Dwight Howard (28)
| Dwight Howard (14)
| Jameer Nelson (10)
| Amway Arena18,846
| 14–23
|- bgcolor=#ccffcc
| 38
| March 5
| Philadelphia
| 
| Brandon Jennings (33)
| Ersan İlyasova (18)
| Brandon Jennings (7)
| Bradley Center12,315
| 15–23
|- bgcolor=ffcccc
| 39
| March 7
| Chicago
| 
| Ersan İlyasova (32)
| Ersan İlyasova (10)
| Beno Udrih (7)
| Bradley Center15,389
| 15–24
|- bgcolor=#ccffcc
| 40
| March 9
| New York
| 
| Ersan İlyasova (26)
| Larry Sanders (11)
| Brandon Jennings (10)
| Bradley Center18,717
| 16–24
|- bgcolor=#ccffcc
| 41
| March 11
| @ Toronto
| 
| Ersan İlyasova (31)
| Ersan İlyasova (12)
| Mike DunleavyBrandon Jennings (6)
| Air Canada Centre17,316
| 17–24
|- bgcolor=#ccffcc
| 42
| March 12
| @ New Jersey
| 
| Brandon Jennings (34)
| Drew Gooden (8)
| Three players (7)
| Prudential Center12,930
| 18–24
|- bgcolor=#ccffcc
| 43
| March 14
| Cleveland
| 
| Ersan İlyasova (22)
| Luc Mbah a Moute (13)
| Drew Gooden (13)
| Bradley Center15,319
| 19–24
|- bgcolor=#ccffcc
| 44
| March 16
| @ Golden State
| 
| Mike Dunleavy (24)
| Luc Mbah a Moute (17)
| Beno Udrih (9)
| Oracle Arena19,596
| 20–24
|- bgcolor=#ccffcc
| 45
| March 20
| @ Portland
| 
| Drew Gooden (19)
| Ekpe Udoh (6)
| Monta Ellis (9)
| Rose Garden20,387
| 21–24
|- bgcolor=ffcccc
| 46
| March 22
| Boston
| 
| Brandon Jennings (19)
| Ersan İlyasova (14)
| Monta Ellis (7)
| Bradley Center15,171
| 21–25
|- bgcolor=#ccffcc
| 47
| March 23
| @ Charlotte
| 
| Luc Mbah a Moute (20)
| Drew Gooden (12)
| Beno Udrih (8)
| Time Warner Cable Arena13,729
| 22–25
|- bgcolor=ffcccc
| 48
| March 24
| Indiana
| 
| Ersan İlyasova (22)
| Ersan İlyasova (8)
| Monta Ellis (6)
| Bradley Center16,207
| 22–26
|- bgcolor=ffcccc
| 49
| March 26
| @ New York
| 
| Mike Dunleavy (26)
| Luc Mbah a Moute (7)
| Brandon Jennings (5)
| Madison Square Garden19,763
| 22–27
|- bgcolor=ccffcc
| 50
| March 27
| Atlanta
| 
| Monta Ellis (33)
| Josh Smith (18)
| Monta Ellis (8)
| Bradley Center12,223
| 23–27
|- bgcolor=ccffcc
| 51
| March 30
| @ Cleveland
| 
| Kyrie Irving (29)
| Tristan Thompson (11)
| Beno Udrih (10)
| Quicken Loans Arena16,099
| 24–27
|- bgcolor=ffcccc
| 52
| March 31
| Memphis
| 
| Brandon Jennings (24)
| Ersan İlyasova (16)
| Monta Ellis (5)
| Bradley Center17,106
| 24–28

|- bgcolor=ccffcc
| 53
| April 2
| @ Washington
| 
| Jordan Crawford (23)
| Ersan İlyasova (11)
| John Wall (9)
| Verizon Center16,234
| 25–28
|- bgcolor=ccffcc
| 54
| April 4
| Cleveland
| 
| Monta Ellis (30)
| Tristan Thompson (9)
| Monta Ellis (8)
| Bradley Center11,849
| 26–28
|- bgcolor=ccffcc
| 55
| April 6
| Charlotte
| 
| Byron Mullens (31)
| Ersan İlyasova (15)
| Brandon Jennings (9)
| Bradley Center13,374
| 27–28
|- bgcolor=ccffcc
| 56
| April 7
| Portland
| 
| Beno Udrih (21)
| Ersan İlyasova (12)
| Raymond Felton (10)
| Bradley Center14,969
| 28–28
|- bgcolor=ffcccc
| 57
| April 9
| Oklahoma City
| 
| Russell Westbrook (26)
| Russell Westbrook (7)
| Kevin Durant (8)
| Bradley Center14,111
| 28–29
|- bgcolor=ffcccc
| 58
| April 11
| New York
| 
| Monta Ellis (35)
| Tyson Chandler (11)
| Monta Ellis (10)
| Bradley Center15,534
| 28–30
|- bgcolor=ccffcc
| 59
| April 13
| @ Detroit
| 
| Drew Gooden (26)
| Greg Monroe (10)
| Brandon Jennings (10)
| The Palace of Auburn Hills15,255
| 29–30
|- bgcolor=ffcccc
| 60
| April 14
| Indiana
| 
| Monta Ellis (20)
| Roy Hibbert (14)
| Brandon Jennings (10)
| Bradley Center15,143
| 29–31
|- bgcolor=ffcccc
| 61
| April 18
| @ Washington
| 
| Jordan Crawford (32)
| Drew Gooden (12)
| John Wall (10)
| Verizon Center14,141
| 29–32
|- bgcolor=ffcccc
| 62
| April 19
| @ Indiana
| 
| Danny Granger (29)
| David West (14)
| George Hill (18)
| Bankers Life Fieldhouse12,453
| 29–33
|- bgcolor=ccffcc
| 63
| April 21
| New Jersey
| 
| Brandon Jennings (30)
| Ersan İlyasova (17)
| Brandon Jennings (6)
| Bradley Center15,939
| 30–33
|- bgcolor=ccffcc
| 64
| April 23
| Toronto
| 
| Brandon Jennings (25)
| Ersan İlyasova (15)
| Two players (5)
| Bradley Center13,867
| 31–33
|- bgcolor=ffcccc
| 65
| April 25
| Philadelphia
| 
| Evan Turner (29)
| Tobias HarrisEvan Turner (13)
| Beno Udrih (9)
| Bradley Center13,489
| 31–34
|- bgcolor=ffcccc
| 66
| April 26
| @ Boston
| 
| Tobias Harris (16)
| Tobias HarrisBrandon Bass (9)
| Rajon Rondo (15)
| TD Garden18,624
| 31–35

Player statistics

Regular season

|- align="center" bgcolor=""
|  
| 12 || 12 || 30.3 || .449 || .000 || .609 || 8.3 || 2.6 || 1.0 ||style="background:#E32636;color:white;" |2.0 ||11.3
|- align="center" bgcolor="#f0f0f0"
| 
| 35 || 0 || 6.8 || .333 || .000 || .467 || 2.1 || .3 || .1 || .0 || 1.1
|- align="center" bgcolor=""
| 
| 54 || 53 || 28.5 || .402 || .360 || .792 || 3.9 || 2.3 || 1.5 || .2 || 9.0
|- align="center" bgcolor="#f0f0f0"
| 
| 55 || 3 || 26.3 || .474 || .399 || .811 || 3.7 || 2.1 || .5 || .1 || 12.3
|- align="center" bgcolor=""
|  
| 21 || 21 ||style="background:#E32636;color:white;" |36.0 || .432 || .267 || .764 || 3.5 ||style="background:#E32636;color:white;" |5.9 || 1.4 || .3 || 17.6
|- align="center" bgcolor="#f0f0f0"
| 
| 56 || 46 || 26.2 || .437 || .291 ||style="background:#E32636;color:white;" |.846 || 6.5 || 2.6 || .8 || .6 || 13.7
|- align="center" bgcolor=""
| 
| 42 || 9 || 11.4 || .467 || .261 || .815 || 2.4 || .5 || .3 || .2 || 5.0
|- align="center" bgcolor="#f0f0f0"
|  
| 5 || 0 || 7.8 || .154 || .000 ||  || .6 || 1.2 || .0 || .0 || .8
|- align="center" bgcolor=""
| 
| 60 || 41 || 27.6 || .492 || .455 || .781 ||style="background:#E32636;color:white;" |8.8 || 1.2 || .7 || .7 || 13.0
|- align="center" bgcolor="#f0f0f0"
|  
| 26 || 13 || 27.4 || .357 || .278 || .833 || 3.2 || 3.0 || 1.0 || .2 || 10.5
|- align="center" bgcolor=""
| 
|style="background:#E32636;color:white;" |66 ||style="background:#E32636;color:white;" |66 || 35.3 || .418 || .332 || .808 || 3.4 || 5.5 ||style="background:#E32636;color:white;" |1.6 || .3 ||style="background:#E32636;color:white;" |19.1
|- align="center" bgcolor="#f0f0f0"
| 
| 46 || 12 || 12.1 || .508 || .333 || .750 || 2.6 || .5 || .3 || .4 || 4.7
|- align="center" bgcolor=""
| 
| 58 || 27 || 18.8 || .469 ||style="background:#E32636;color:white;" |.667 || .785 || 2.1 || 2.1 || .5 || .3 || 5.5
|- align="center" bgcolor="#f0f0f0"
| 
| 43 || 22 || 23.5 ||style="background:#E32636;color:white;" |.510 || .250 || .641 || 5.3 || .7 || .9 || .5 || 7.7
|- align="center" bgcolor=""
| 
| 52 || 0 || 12.4 || .457 || .000 || .474 || 3.1 || .6 || .6 || 1.5 || 3.6
|- align="center" bgcolor="#f0f0f0"
|  
| 23 || 5 || 20.1 || .409 || .000 || .800 || 4.7 || 1.1 || .7 || 1.6 || 5.7
|- align="center" bgcolor=""
| 
| 59 || 0 || 18.3 || .440 || .288 || .709 || 1.7 || 3.8 || .6 || 0.0 || 5.9
|}
  Statistics with the Milwaukee Bucks.

Awards
 Ersan İlyasova was named Eastern Conference Player of the Week (March 5 – March 11).
 Drew Gooden was named Eastern Conference Player of the Week (March 12 – March 18).

Injuries and disciplinary actions
 Center Kwame Brown, who had been traded to Milwaukee by the Golden State Warriors on January, underwent surgery to repair a torn pectoralis major muscle and missed the remainder of the regular season.
 Drew Gooden served a one-game suspension and missed the first home game of the season for Milwaukee after committing a flagrant foul in the first game of the regular season.
 Stephen Jackson was suspended for one game on two occasions. First by the team, after missing the bus to a morning shootaround before a game against the New York Knicks and then by the league for verbal abuse of an official and failure to leave the court in a timely manner after a game against the Chicago Bulls.
 Larry Sanders received a two game suspension after starting an altercation and failing to leave the court in a timely manner during a game against the Indiana Pacers.

Transactions

Overview

Trades

Free agents

Many players signed with teams from other leagues due to the 2011 NBA lockout. FIBA allows players under NBA contracts to sign and play for teams from other leagues if the contracts have opt-out clauses that allow the players to return to the NBA if the lockout ends. The Chinese Basketball Association, however, only allows its clubs to sign foreign free agents who could play for at least the entire season.

See also
2011–12 NBA season

References

Milwaukee Bucks seasons
Milwaukee Bucks
Milwaukee Bucks
Milwaukee Bucks